Sobolevsky District is an administrative and municipal district (raion) of Kamchatka Krai, Russia, one of the eleven in the krai. It is located in the southwest of the krai. Its administrative center is the rural locality (a selo) of Sobolevo. Population:  The population of Sobolevo accounts for 68.1% of the district's total population.

References

Notes

Sources

Districts of Kamchatka Krai